Gemmula congener, common name Melvill's turrid, is a species of sea snail, a marine gastropod mollusk in the family Turridae, the turrids.

Synonyms
 Gemmula congener cosmoi (Sykes, 1930): synonym of Gemmula cosmoi (Sykes, 1930)
 Gemmula congener diomedea Powell, 1964: synonym of Gemmula diomedea Powell, 1964
 Gemmula congener unilineata Powell, 1967: synonym of Cryptogemma unilineata (Powell, 1967) (basionym)
 Gemmula congener webberae Kilburn, 1975: synonym of Gemmula webberae Kilburn, 1975

Description
The length of the shell varies between 40 mm and 90 mm.

Distribution
This marine species occurs in the Indo-West Pacific, in the Bay of Bengal, off the Philippines and off Western Australia; in the East China Sea, northern South China Sea and Nansha Islands; off Japan.

References

 Schepman, M.M. 1913. Toxoglossa. pp. 384–396 in Weber, M. & de Beaufort, L.F. (eds). The Prosobranchia, Pulmonata and Opisthobranchia Tectibranchiata, Tribe Bullomorpha, of the Siboga Expedition. Monograph 49. Siboga Expeditie 32(2)
 Melvill, J.C. 1917. A revision of the Turridae (Pleurotomidae) occurring in the Persian Gulf, Gulf of Oman and North Arabian Sea as evidenced mostly through the results of dredging carried out by Mr. F.W. Townsend, 1893-1914. Proceedings of the Malacological Society of London 12(4-5): 140-201
 Powell, A.W.B. 1964. The Family Turridae in the Indo-Pacific. Part 1. The Subfamily Turrinae. Indo-Pacific Mollusca 1: 227-346 
 Kilburn R.N. (1975). Taxonomic notes on South African marine Mollusca (5): including descriptions of new taxa of Rissoidae, Cerithiidae, Tonnidae, Cassididae, Buccinidae, Fasciolariidae, Turbinellidae, Turridae, Architectonicidae, Epitoniidae, Limidae and Thraciidae. Annals of the Natal Museum 22(2):577-622, figs. 1-25.
 Cernohorsky, W.O. 1987. Taxonomic notes on some deep-water Turridae (Mollusca: Gastropoda) from the Malagasy Republic. Records of the Auckland Institute and Museum 24: figs 1-25 
 Wilson, B. 1994. Australian marine shells. Prosobranch gastropods. Kallaroo, WA : Odyssey Publishing Vol. 2 370 pp.
 Liu, J.Y. [Ruiyu] (ed.). (2008). Checklist of marine biota of China seas. China Science Press. 1267 pp
 Li B. [Baoquan] & Li X. [Xinzheng]. (2008). Report on the turrid genera Gemmula, Lophiotoma and Ptychosyrinx (Gastropoda: Turridae: Turrinae) from the China seas. Zootaxa. 1778: 1-25.

External links
 Gastropods.com: Gemmula (Gemmula) congener congener
 Smith, E.A. 1894. Natural history notes from H.M. Indian Marine Survey Steamer "Investigator", Commander C.F. Oldham, R.N. - Series II., No. 10. Report on some Mollusca dredged in the Bay of Bengal and the Arabian Sea. Annals and Magazine of Natural History 6 14(81): 157-174 366-368, pls 3-5
  Tucker, J.K. 2004 Catalog of recent and fossil turrids (Mollusca: Gastropoda). Zootaxa 682:1-1295.

congener
Gastropods described in 1894